Maria Rosaria "Rosy" Bindi (born 12 February 1951) is an Italian politician and the former President of the Antimafia Commission.

Career
Born in Sinalunga (Tuscany), she graduated in political science. She was standing near the lawyer Vittorio Bachelet when he was assassinated by the Red Brigades in 1980. She held the position of vice-president of Azione Cattolica, the most popular Italian Catholic lay association, from 1984 to 1989, the year she joined the Christian Democracy (DC) party.

After the dissolution of the DC party, Bindi joined the Italian People's Party and became a leading figure in The Olive Tree, the broad left-to-centre coalition led by Romano Prodi. Following the coalition's victory in the 1996 general election, she was named Minister of Health, a position she held also in the following governments led by Massimo D'Alema.

During her tenure at the Ministry of Health, through her circular "Circolare Bindi del 2 dicembre 1996", electroshock therapy was re-introduced in Italy to treat psychiatrised patients. It was later corrected by "Circolare Bindi del 15 February 1999" 'limiting' use of ECT in particular cases but without revoke it.

In the 2001 general election she was elected for the third time to the Chamber of Deputies in the college of Cortona representing Democracy is Freedom – The Daisy. After the victory of The Union in the 2006 Italian general election, she became Minister for the Family, serving in that post until 2008.

Bindi competed for the leadership of the Democratic Party in the party's founding leadership election, and received 12.93% of the vote cast. She continues to work for the party, leading the Democrats Really faction.

Electoral history

First-past-the-post elections

References

External links
Personal website 

1951 births
Living people
People from Sinalunga
Italian Roman Catholics
Christian Democracy (Italy) politicians
Italian People's Party (1994) politicians
Democracy is Freedom – The Daisy politicians
Democratic Party (Italy) politicians
Italian Ministers of Health
Deputies of Legislature XII of Italy
Deputies of Legislature XIII of Italy
Deputies of Legislature XIV of Italy
Deputies of Legislature XV of Italy
Deputies of Legislature XVI of Italy
Deputies of Legislature XVII of Italy
21st-century Italian women politicians
Women government ministers of Italy
20th-century Italian women politicians
Libera Università Internazionale degli Studi Sociali Guido Carli alumni
Women members of the Chamber of Deputies (Italy)